Lam Siu-por (born 28 March 1954) is a Hong Kong mathematician and the husband of Carrie Lam, who served as the fourth Chief Executive of Hong Kong from 2017 to 2022.

Career
Lam earned his doctorate in algebraic topology from the University of Cambridge in 1983, after writing his thesis under the direction of Frank Adams.

He used to teach at the Chinese University of Hong Kong and had stayed in the UK. Lam also taught short courses at the Capital Normal University in Beijing before his wife announced her candidacy for chief executive in December 2016.

Personal life
With Carrie Lam, Lam Siu-por has two sons, Jeremy and Joshua, both of whom studied in Great Britain.

He and his two adult sons hold Hong Kong and British nationality, allowing Carrie Lam the ability to move to the UK alongside her family.

Political views
In a closed-door meeting during the 2019–20 Hong Kong protests, Carrie Lam said that Lam Siu-por had told her that she would be "condemned by history".

During the ceremony of the 20th anniversary of the handover of Macau in 2019, Lam was spotted not clapping and not singing during a group sing-along of the patriotic song "Ode to the Motherland" led by Chinese President and General Secretary of the Communist Party Xi Jinping. This was seen by some as a silent act of support for Hong Kong's pro democracy movement. An editorial compared Lam's behavior to August Landmesser's refusal to perform the Nazi salute with fellow workers during the reign of Nazi Germany.

Research
According to the mathematics review database zbMATH Open , Lam has only one publication so far, published when he was doing his PhD.

References

External links
 

Alumni of the University of Cambridge
Hong Kong mathematicians
1954 births
Living people